The Scandinavian Open Championship is a Group 3 flat horse race in Denmark open to thoroughbreds aged three years or older. It is run over a distance of 2,400 metres (about 1½ miles) at Klampenborg in early August.

History
The event was first run with its present title in 1977 & 1978 then reintroduced in 1996. It replaced the Dansk Eclipse Stakes, Denmark's version of the Eclipse Stakes.

For a period the Scandinavian Open Championship held Listed status. It was promoted to Group 3 level in 2000. That year's running was the first Group race to be staged in Denmark. It is currently the country's only Group race. The 2014 and 2015 renewals took place in June.

Records
Most successful horse (3 wins):
 Suspicious Mind - 2020, 2021, 2022

Leading jockey (6 wins):
 Per-Anders Gråberg – Equip Hill (2007), Bank of Burden (2012, 2013), Suspicious Mind (2020, 2021, 2022)

Leading trainer (3 wins):
 Cathrine Erichsen – Albaran (1998, 1999), Master Bloom (2019)

 Niels Petersen – Bank of Burden (2012, 2013), Without Fear (2014)
 Nina Lensvik - Suspicious Mind (2020, 2021, 2022)

Winners

Dansk Eclipse Stakes
The Dansk Eclipse Stakes was the precursor of the Scandinavian Open Championship. It was last run in 1995.

 1987: Obidos
 1988: Sunset Boulevard
 1989: Sunset Boulevard
 1990: Icemood
 1991: Silvestro
 1992: Silvestro
 1993: Kateb
 1994: Kateb
 1995: Matahif

See also
 List of Scandinavian flat horse races

References

 Racing Post:

 danskgalop.dk – Storløbsvindere.
 galopp-sieger.de – Scandinavian Open Championship.
 ifhaonline.org – International Federation of Horseracing Authorities – Scandinavian Open Championship (2019).
 pedigreequery.com – Scandinavian Open Championship – Klampenborg.

Open middle distance horse races
Sport in Copenhagen
Horse races in Denmark
1996 establishments in Denmark
Recurring sporting events established in 1996
Summer events in Denmark